Carrie Willmott (born 8 June 1975) is a British swimmer. She competed in the women's 4 × 100 metre freestyle relay event at the 1996 Summer Olympics.

References

External links
 

1975 births
Living people
British female swimmers
Olympic swimmers of Great Britain
Swimmers at the 1996 Summer Olympics
Sportspeople from Luton
British female freestyle swimmers
20th-century British women